The 2002–03 Phoenix Coyotes season was their seventh season in the National Hockey League, the franchise's 24th season in the NHL and 31st overall. The Coyotes failed to make the playoffs for the first time since the 2000–01 season.

Offseason

Regular season
 January 8, 2003: Chicago Blackhawks goaltender Michael Leighton earned a shutout in his NHL debut in a 0–0 tie against the Phoenix Coyotes. Coyotes goaltender Zac Bierk earned his first career shutout, although it was not his NHL debut. It was the first time that two goaltenders in the same game both earned their first career shutouts.

The Coyotes finished the regular season having allowed the most power-play goals of all 30 NHL teams, with 77.

Final standings

Schedule and results

|- align="center" bgcolor="#FFBBBB"
|1||L||October 9, 2002||1–4 || align="left"| @ Los Angeles Kings (2002–03) ||0–1–0–0 || 
|- align="center" bgcolor="#FFBBBB"
|2||L||October 12, 2002||2–5 || align="left"|  Dallas Stars (2002–03) ||0–2–0–0 || 
|- align="center" bgcolor="#CCFFCC"
|3||W||October 14, 2002||4–2 || align="left"| @ Columbus Blue Jackets (2002–03) ||1–2–0–0 || 
|- align="center" bgcolor="#FFBBBB"
|4||L||October 15, 2002||1–2 || align="left"| @ Ottawa Senators (2002–03) ||1–3–0–0 || 
|- align="center" bgcolor="#FFBBBB"
|5||L||October 17, 2002||3–5 || align="left"| @ Toronto Maple Leafs (2002–03) ||1–4–0–0 || 
|- align="center" bgcolor="#CCFFCC"
|6||W||October 19, 2002||3–2 || align="left"| @ Buffalo Sabres (2002–03) ||2–4–0–0 || 
|- align="center" bgcolor="#CCFFCC"
|7||W||October 22, 2002||2–1 || align="left"| @ Nashville Predators (2002–03) ||3–4–0–0 || 
|- align="center" bgcolor="#FFBBBB"
|8||L||October 24, 2002||2–3 || align="left"|  Colorado Avalanche (2002–03) ||3–5–0–0 || 
|- align="center" bgcolor="#FFBBBB"
|9||L||October 26, 2002||1–6 || align="left"|  Minnesota Wild (2002–03) ||3–6–0–0 || 
|- align="center" bgcolor="#FF6F6F"
|10||OTL||October 28, 2002||2–3 OT|| align="left"| @ New York Rangers (2002–03) ||3–6–0–1 || 
|- align="center" bgcolor="#CCFFCC"
|11||W||October 29, 2002||3–2 || align="left"| @ New York Islanders (2002–03) ||4–6–0–1 || 
|- align="center" bgcolor="#FFBBBB"
|12||L||October 31, 2002||2–6 || align="left"| @ Philadelphia Flyers (2002–03) ||4–7–0–1 || 
|-

|- align="center" bgcolor="#CCFFCC"
|13||W||November 3, 2002||2–1 OT|| align="left"|  Nashville Predators (2002–03) ||5–7–0–1 || 
|- align="center" bgcolor="#CCFFCC"
|14||W||November 7, 2002||4–1 || align="left"|  Minnesota Wild (2002–03) ||6–7–0–1 || 
|- align="center" bgcolor="#FFBBBB"
|15||L||November 9, 2002||2–5 || align="left"|  Vancouver Canucks (2002–03) ||6–8–0–1 || 
|- align="center" bgcolor="#FFBBBB"
|16||L||November 11, 2002||2–4 || align="left"| @ Tampa Bay Lightning (2002–03) ||6–9–0–1 || 
|- align="center" bgcolor="#FFBBBB"
|17||L||November 12, 2002||2–3 || align="left"| @ Carolina Hurricanes (2002–03) ||6–10–0–1 || 
|- align="center" bgcolor="#CCFFCC"
|18||W||November 15, 2002||5–1 || align="left"| @ Atlanta Thrashers (2002–03) ||7–10–0–1 || 
|- align="center"
|19||T||November 17, 2002||4–4 OT|| align="left"|  Colorado Avalanche (2002–03) ||7–10–1–1 || 
|- align="center"
|20||T||November 20, 2002||2–2 OT|| align="left"|  Dallas Stars (2002–03) ||7–10–2–1 || 
|- align="center"
|21||T||November 22, 2002||3–3 OT|| align="left"|  Florida Panthers (2002–03) ||7–10–3–1 || 
|- align="center" bgcolor="#FFBBBB"
|22||L||November 25, 2002||1–5 || align="left"| @ Dallas Stars (2002–03) ||7–11–3–1 || 
|- align="center"
|23||T||November 27, 2002||2–2 OT|| align="left"| @ Mighty Ducks of Anaheim (2002–03) ||7–11–4–1 || 
|- align="center" bgcolor="#FFBBBB"
|24||L||November 28, 2002||2–4 || align="left"|  Chicago Blackhawks (2002–03) ||7–12–4–1 || 
|- align="center" bgcolor="#CCFFCC"
|25||W||November 30, 2002||3–2 || align="left"| @ San Jose Sharks (2002–03) ||8–12–4–1 || 
|-

|- align="center" bgcolor="#FF6F6F"
|26||OTL||December 3, 2002||2–3 OT|| align="left"|  San Jose Sharks (2002–03) ||8–12–4–2 || 
|- align="center" bgcolor="#FFBBBB"
|27||L||December 5, 2002||3–5 || align="left"|  Detroit Red Wings (2002–03) ||8–13–4–2 || 
|- align="center" bgcolor="#FFBBBB"
|28||L||December 7, 2002||2–4 || align="left"|  Montreal Canadiens (2002–03) ||8–14–4–2 || 
|- align="center"
|29||T||December 9, 2002||3–3 OT|| align="left"|  Columbus Blue Jackets (2002–03) ||8–14–5–2 || 
|- align="center" bgcolor="#CCFFCC"
|30||W||December 11, 2002||4–2 || align="left"|  Atlanta Thrashers (2002–03) ||9–14–5–2 || 
|- align="center" bgcolor="#FFBBBB"
|31||L||December 13, 2002||3–4 || align="left"|  Washington Capitals (2002–03) ||9–15–5–2 || 
|- align="center" bgcolor="#CCFFCC"
|32||W||December 15, 2002||2–1 || align="left"|  Los Angeles Kings (2002–03) ||10–15–5–2 || 
|- align="center" bgcolor="#CCFFCC"
|33||W||December 17, 2002||5–2 || align="left"|  Pittsburgh Penguins (2002–03) ||11–15–5–2 || 
|- align="center"
|34||T||December 20, 2002||3–3 OT|| align="left"|  St. Louis Blues (2002–03) ||11–15–6–2 || 
|- align="center" bgcolor="#FFBBBB"
|35||L||December 22, 2002||0–4 || align="left"| @ Mighty Ducks of Anaheim (2002–03) ||11–16–6–2 || 
|- align="center" bgcolor="#FF6F6F"
|36||OTL||December 26, 2002||3–4 OT|| align="left"| @ Los Angeles Kings (2002–03) ||11–16–6–3 || 
|- align="center" bgcolor="#CCFFCC"
|37||W||December 28, 2002||4–0 || align="left"|  Philadelphia Flyers (2002–03) ||12–16–6–3 || 
|- align="center" bgcolor="#CCFFCC"
|38||W||December 30, 2002||4–3 OT|| align="left"|  Edmonton Oilers (2002–03) ||13–16–6–3 || 
|-

|- align="center" bgcolor="#CCFFCC"
|39||W||January 1, 2003||2–1 OT|| align="left"| @ Washington Capitals (2002–03) ||14–16–6–3 || 
|- align="center" bgcolor="#CCFFCC"
|40||W||January 3, 2003||4–1 || align="left"| @ Detroit Red Wings (2002–03) ||15–16–6–3 || 
|- align="center" bgcolor="#FFBBBB"
|41||L||January 4, 2003||0–2 || align="left"| @ Columbus Blue Jackets (2002–03) ||15–17–6–3 || 
|- align="center"
|42||T||January 8, 2003||0–0 OT|| align="left"| @ Chicago Blackhawks (2002–03) ||15–17–7–3 || 
|- align="center" bgcolor="#FFBBBB"
|43||L||January 10, 2003||1–2 || align="left"| @ Minnesota Wild (2002–03) ||15–18–7–3 || 
|- align="center" bgcolor="#FF6F6F"
|44||OTL||January 11, 2003||3–4 OT|| align="left"| @ Nashville Predators (2002–03) ||15–18–7–4 || 
|- align="center" bgcolor="#FFBBBB"
|45||L||January 14, 2003||1–4 || align="left"|  St. Louis Blues (2002–03) ||15–19–7–4 || 
|- align="center" bgcolor="#FFBBBB"
|46||L||January 18, 2003||0–1 || align="left"|  Buffalo Sabres (2002–03) ||15–20–7–4 || 
|- align="center" bgcolor="#CCFFCC"
|47||W||January 20, 2003||3–1 || align="left"|  San Jose Sharks (2002–03) ||16–20–7–4 || 
|- align="center" bgcolor="#CCFFCC"
|48||W||January 23, 2003||7–1 || align="left"| @ Calgary Flames (2002–03) ||17–20–7–4 || 
|- align="center" bgcolor="#CCFFCC"
|49||W||January 24, 2003||5–1 || align="left"| @ Edmonton Oilers (2002–03) ||18–20–7–4 || 
|- align="center" bgcolor="#FFBBBB"
|50||L||January 26, 2003||0–1 || align="left"| @ Vancouver Canucks (2002–03) ||18–21–7–4 || 
|- align="center" bgcolor="#CCFFCC"
|51||W||January 28, 2003||4–3 || align="left"|  Calgary Flames (2002–03) ||19–21–7–4 || 
|-

|- align="center" bgcolor="#FFBBBB"
|52||L||February 5, 2003||3–4 || align="left"| @ Los Angeles Kings (2002–03) ||19–22–7–4 || 
|- align="center" bgcolor="#FFBBBB"
|53||L||February 7, 2003||2–3 || align="left"| @ Mighty Ducks of Anaheim (2002–03) ||19–23–7–4 || 
|- align="center" bgcolor="#FFBBBB"
|54||L||February 8, 2003||1–3 || align="left"|  Dallas Stars (2002–03) ||19–24–7–4 || 
|- align="center" bgcolor="#FFBBBB"
|55||L||February 12, 2003||0–3 || align="left"|  New Jersey Devils (2002–03) ||19–25–7–4 || 
|- align="center" bgcolor="#CCFFCC"
|56||W||February 14, 2003||3–2 || align="left"| @ Minnesota Wild (2002–03) ||20–25–7–4 || 
|- align="center" bgcolor="#CCFFCC"
|57||W||February 15, 2003||5–3 || align="left"| @ St. Louis Blues (2002–03) ||21–25–7–4 || 
|- align="center" bgcolor="#CCFFCC"
|58||W||February 18, 2003||5–2 || align="left"|  Columbus Blue Jackets (2002–03) ||22–25–7–4 || 
|- align="center" bgcolor="#CCFFCC"
|59||W||February 20, 2003||2–1 || align="left"| @ Chicago Blackhawks (2002–03) ||23–25–7–4 || 
|- align="center"
|60||T||February 21, 2003||2–2 OT|| align="left"| @ Dallas Stars (2002–03) ||23–25–8–4 || 
|- align="center" bgcolor="#FFBBBB"
|61||L||February 23, 2003||2–4 || align="left"|  Calgary Flames (2002–03) ||23–26–8–4 || 
|- align="center" bgcolor="#CCFFCC"
|62||W||February 26, 2003||4–2 || align="left"|  Carolina Hurricanes (2002–03) ||24–26–8–4 || 
|- align="center" bgcolor="#CCFFCC"
|63||W||February 28, 2003||3–1 || align="left"|  Mighty Ducks of Anaheim (2002–03) ||25–26–8–4 || 
|-

|- align="center" bgcolor="#FFBBBB"
|64||L||March 2, 2003||2–5 || align="left"| @ Detroit Red Wings (2002–03) ||25–27–8–4 || 
|- align="center" bgcolor="#CCFFCC"
|65||W||March 4, 2003||4–1 || align="left"| @ Pittsburgh Penguins (2002–03) ||26–27–8–4 || 
|- align="center" bgcolor="#FFBBBB"
|66||L||March 6, 2003||3–6 || align="left"| @ St. Louis Blues (2002–03) ||26–28–8–4 || 
|- align="center" bgcolor="#CCFFCC"
|67||W||March 8, 2003||6–4 || align="left"|  San Jose Sharks (2002–03) ||27–28–8–4 || 
|- align="center"
|68||T||March 10, 2003||2–2 OT|| align="left"| @ Colorado Avalanche (2002–03) ||27–28–9–4 || 
|- align="center" bgcolor="#FFBBBB"
|69||L||March 12, 2003||2–3 || align="left"|  Detroit Red Wings (2002–03) ||27–29–9–4 || 
|- align="center" bgcolor="#FFBBBB"
|70||L||March 14, 2003||0–4 || align="left"|  Chicago Blackhawks (2002–03) ||27–30–9–4 || 
|- align="center" bgcolor="#CCFFCC"
|71||W||March 15, 2003||4–2 || align="left"|  Mighty Ducks of Anaheim (2002–03) ||28–30–9–4 || 
|- align="center" bgcolor="#CCFFCC"
|72||W||March 18, 2003||2–1 || align="left"|  Boston Bruins (2002–03) ||29–30–9–4 || 
|- align="center" bgcolor="#CCFFCC"
|73||W||March 20, 2003||3–2 OT|| align="left"|  Edmonton Oilers (2002–03) ||30–30–9–4 || 
|- align="center" bgcolor="#FFBBBB"
|74||L||March 22, 2003||0–4 || align="left"|  Tampa Bay Lightning (2002–03) ||30–31–9–4 || 
|- align="center" bgcolor="#FFBBBB"
|75||L||March 24, 2003||0–2 || align="left"| @ Calgary Flames (2002–03) ||30–32–9–4 || 
|- align="center" bgcolor="#FFBBBB"
|76||L||March 26, 2003||3–4 || align="left"| @ Edmonton Oilers (2002–03) ||30–33–9–4 || 
|- align="center" bgcolor="#FFBBBB"
|77||L||March 27, 2003||1–5 || align="left"| @ Vancouver Canucks (2002–03) ||30–34–9–4 || 
|- align="center" bgcolor="#FFBBBB"
|78||L||March 29, 2003||1–6 || align="left"| @ Colorado Avalanche (2002–03) ||30–35–9–4 || 
|- align="center" bgcolor="#FF6F6F"
|79||OTL||March 31, 2003||4–5 OT|| align="left"|  Los Angeles Kings (2002–03) ||30–35–9–5 || 
|-

|- align="center"
|80||T||April 2, 2003||3–3 OT|| align="left"|  Vancouver Canucks (2002–03) ||30–35–10–5 || 
|- align="center" bgcolor="#CCFFCC"
|81||W||April 4, 2003||1–0 || align="left"|  Nashville Predators (2002–03) ||31–35–10–5 || 
|- align="center"
|82||T||April 6, 2003||3–3 OT|| align="left"| @ San Jose Sharks (2002–03) ||31–35–11–5 || 
|-

|-
| Legend:

Player statistics

Scoring
 Position abbreviations: C = Center; D = Defense; G = Goaltender; LW = Left Wing; RW = Right Wing
  = Joined team via a transaction (e.g., trade, waivers, signing) during the season. Stats reflect time with the Coyotes only.
  = Left team via a transaction (e.g., trade, waivers, release) during the season. Stats reflect time with the Coyotes only.

Goaltending
  = Joined team via a transaction (e.g., trade, waivers, signing) during the season. Stats reflect time with the Coyotes only.
  = Left team via a transaction (e.g., trade, waivers, release) during the season. Stats reflect time with the Coyotes only.

Awards and records

Awards

Milestones

Transactions
The Coyotes were involved in the following transactions from June 14, 2002, the day after the deciding game of the 2002 Stanley Cup Finals, through June 9, 2003, the day of the deciding game of the 2003 Stanley Cup Finals.

Trades

Players acquired

Players lost

Signings

Draft picks
Phoenix's draft picks at the 2002 NHL Entry Draft held at the Air Canada Centre in Toronto, Ontario.

See also
2002–03 NHL season

Notes

References

Pho
Pho
Arizona Coyotes seasons